6/1 may refer to:
June 1 (month-day date notation)
January 6 (day-month date notation)
The United States Capitol attack, which occurred on January 6, 2021

See also
 Sixth (disambiguation)
 1/6 (disambiguation)
 Six One, Irish news show 
 Six of One (disambiguation)